The Tango of the Widower and its Distorting Mirror is a Chilean film directed by Raúl Ruiz in 1967 and completed by his widow Valeria Sarmiento for a February 2020 premiere at the 70th Berlin International Film Festival.

Cast
 Rubén Sotoconil
 Claudia Paz
 Luis Alarcón
 Shenda Román
 Delfina Guzmán
 Luis Vilches
 Sergio Hernández (voice only)

References

External links

Chilean drama films
Films directed by Raúl Ruiz
Films directed by Valeria Sarmiento
2020 films